Blokktinden or Blokktind is a mountain in the municipality of Rødøy in Nordland county, Norway. It is located on the southern side of Tjongsfjorden, across from the village of Tjong. The summit has a good view of the Svartisen glacier and the coastal islands.

Name
The first element is blokk which means "block" or "mountain that consists of one single rock".  The last element is the finite form of tind which means "mountain peak".

References

Rødøy
Mountains of Nordland